Robert C. Flowers (August 6, 1917 – December 8, 1962) was an American football player who played eight seasons for the Green Bay Packers.

1917 births
American football offensive linemen
Texas Tech Red Raiders football players
Green Bay Packers players
1962 deaths
People from Big Spring, Texas